Casaletto may refer to the following communes in Italy:

Casaletto Ceredano, in the province of Cremona
Casaletto di Sopra, in the province of Cremona
Casaletto Lodigiano, in the province of Lodi 
Casaletto Spartano, in the province of Salerno
Casaletto Vaprio, in the province of Cremona